Corycus was a Greek town in ancient Pamphylia, near Attaleia. Strabo mention that Attalus II Philadelphus, who had also founded the city of Attaleia, sent a colony to Corycus and surrounded it with a greater circuit-wall.

The location of the town has not been determined with certainty.

References 

Former populated places in Turkey
Populated places in ancient Pamphylia
Lost ancient cities and towns